Judah ben Dama  was one of the Ten Martyrs slain in the Jewish literary work, the Midrash Eleh Ezkerah.

External links 
 Its bibliography:
Zunz, G. V. p. 142;
A. Jellinek, B. H. 2:23 et seq.; 5:41; 6:17 et seq.;
Benjacob, Oẓar ha-Sefarim, p. 299.
On the problem of the synchronism of the ten martyrs see Heinrich Grätz, Gesch. iv. 175 et seq., and Monatsschrift, i. 314 et seq.
A German translation by P. Möbius appeared in 1845.

Smaller midrashim
136 deaths
Mishnah rabbis
Jewish martyrs